The 1968–69 AHL season was the 33rd season of the American Hockey League. Eight teams played 74 games each in the schedule.  The Buffalo Bisons finished first overall in the regular season. The Hershey Bears won their fourth Calder Cup championship.

Final standings
Note: GP = Games played; W = Wins; L = Losses; T = Ties; GF = Goals for; GA = Goals against; Pts = Points;

Scoring leaders

Note: GP = Games played; G = Goals; A = Assists; Pts = Points; PIM = Penalty minutes

 complete list

Calder Cup playoffs
First round
Hershey Bears defeated Buffalo Bisons 4 games to 2.
Providence Reds defeated Baltimore Clippers 3 games to 1.
Quebec Aces defeated Cleveland Barons 3 games to 2.
Second round
Hershey Bears earned second round bye.
Quebec Aces defeated Providence Reds 3 games to 2.  
Finals
Hershey Bears defeated Quebec Aces 4 games to 1, to win the Calder Cup. 
 list of scores

Trophy and award winners
Team awards

Individual awards

Other awards

See also
List of AHL seasons

References
AHL official site
AHL Hall of Fame
HockeyDB

American Hockey League seasons
2
2